Frederik Dahl Ihler (born 25 June 2003) is a Danish footballer currently playing as a forward for Skive IK, on loan from Danish Superliga club AGF.

Personal life
Ihler is Christian and prays when waking up and before playing a match.

Career statistics

Club

Notes

References

2003 births
Living people
Danish men's footballers
Danish expatriate men's footballers
Denmark youth international footballers
Association football forwards
Danish Superliga players
Aarhus Gymnastikforening players
Valur (men's football) players
Skive IK players
Danish expatriate sportspeople in Iceland
Expatriate footballers in Iceland
Footballers from Aarhus